Walter Ferreri (born 1948), originally from Buddusò in Sardinia, is an astronomer at the Italian Osservatorio Astronomico di Torino, science writer and discoverer of minor planets.

He is a member of the "Division III Commission 20 Positions & Motions of Minor Planets, Comets & Satellites" and the "Division III Planetary Systems Sciences" at the IAU. He is credited by the Minor Planet Center with the discovery of 15 numbered minor planets he made at the La Silla Observatory site in Chile between 1984 and 1988.

The outer main-belt asteroid 3308 Ferreri, discovered by astronomers Henri Debehogne and Giovanni de Sanctis, is named after him for his contributions for and popularization of astronomy. Naming citation was published on 14 April 1987.

References 
 

1948 births
Discoverers of asteroids

20th-century Italian astronomers
Italian science writers
Living people
People from the Province of Sassari